Tom O'Reilly is a Papua New Guinean former professional rugby league footballer who represented Papua New Guinea in the 2000 World Cup.

Playing career
O'Reilly played for the Redcliffe Dolphins in the Brisbane Rugby League, and was part of their first premiership since 1965 when they defeated the Wests Panthers in the 1994 grand final. He also represented the Queensland Residents.

O'Reilly played for the Gold Coast Chargers in 1997 and 1998, playing in 34 matches including the club's final game in first grade which was a 20-18 loss against Cronulla.

In 2000, O'Reilly transferred to Oldham (Heritage № 1099) in England. After the 2000 World Cup he had trials with the Salford City Reds. He joined Warrington Wolves in September 2001, after a trial there. He also played for the Bramley Buffaloes, and the Sheffield Eagles.

O'Reilly then transferred to the Pia Donkeys in France, scoring a try in the 2003 Lord Derby Cup Final and playing in the 2004 Challenge Cup.

Representative career
O'Reilly made his representative début during the Super League war, playing in two "test matches" against Australia. Only the Australian Rugby League recognises the matches as tests, and not the International Rugby League Board or any other organisation. In 1996 O'Reilly played for a rebel Papua New Guinea National Rugby League competition selection and in 1997 he was selected for the Rest of the World side.

In 2000, O'Reilly made his début for Papua New Guinea, against Australia in a warm up match for the 2000 World Cup. He was selected for the tournament and played in all four matches for Papua New Guinea. His last match for PNG came in 2001, again against Australia.

References

1974 births
Living people
Baroudeurs de Pia XIII players
Bramley Buffaloes players
Gold Coast Chargers players
Oldham R.L.F.C. players
Papua New Guinea national rugby league team players
Papua New Guinean rugby league players
Papua New Guinean sportsmen
Place of birth missing (living people)
Redcliffe Dolphins players
Rugby league centres
Rugby league five-eighths
Rugby league hookers
Rugby league locks
Sheffield Eagles players
Warrington Wolves players